Frances is an unincorporated community within Crittenden County, Kentucky, United States. It has an elevation of 548 feet. Frances was also called Needmore.

References

Unincorporated communities in Crittenden County, Kentucky
Unincorporated communities in Kentucky